The United States Hockey Hall of Fame was established in 1973 with the goal of preserving the history of ice hockey in the United States while recognizing the extraordinary contributions of select players, coaches, administrators, officials and teams. It is located in Eveleth, Minnesota, an iron mining town in northern Minnesota.

Inductees

With the four-member induction Class of 2020, there are now 192 enshrined members. New members are inducted annually based on their contributions to hockey in the United States during the course of their careers.

Each year, nominations are solicited by USA Hockey from those willing to substantiate the candidacy of a particular individual or team for induction from Jan. 1 through March 31. All nominations are forwarded to the U.S. Hockey Hall of Fame Selection Committee for review. After a thorough evaluation of each candidate, the selection committee conducts a vote to select the newest members of the Hall of Fame.

Museum
The United States Hockey Hall of Fame Museum, the "National Shrine of American Hockey," is dedicated to honoring these legends of the game and showcasing precious U.S. hockey memories. Opened in 1973 in Eveleth, Minn., the unique facility is driven by the mission to preserve and interpret America's proud hockey heritage.

With the "Great Wall of Fame" displaying the inductee plaques, historical displays representing all levels of American hockey, video presentations, interactive experiences and traveling outreach programs, the true spirit and excitement of the sport is captured and the many traditions are proudly presented to hockey fans throughout the country. In downtown Eveleth you will find the "world's largest authentic hockey stick". It is a Christian Brothers hockey stick that measures over 110 ft. and 10,000 lbs.

The Hall of Fame established  the Wayne Gretzky International Award in 1999, as a lifetime achievement award to honor international individuals who have made major contributions to the growth and advancement of ice hockey in the United States.

References

External links

United States Hockey Hall of Fame Museum

Awards established in 1973
1973 establishments in Minnesota
Halls of fame in Minnesota
Ice hockey in Minnesota
Ice hockey museums and halls of fame
Museums established in 1973
Museums in St. Louis County, Minnesota
Sports museums in Minnesota

USA Hockey